Planète+ (formerly Planète Câble) is a French television network that primarily broadcasts documentaries. It is owned by the Canal+ Group. It is available on digital terrestrial television. In France it also operates the following spin-off channels:

Planète+ CI
 Planète+ A&E (formerly Planète+ No-Limit,  Planète+ Choc)
 Planète+ Thalassa

In Canada, a local version entitled Planète+ Canada is distributed by THEMA Canada, a Canadian distribution company.

Former channels
 Planète Juniors (also Ma Planète)

References

External links
 
 Planète Canada official website
 Planete's Polish official website

Television stations in France
MultiThématiques
Television channels and stations established in 1988